Coates is one of the 20 electoral wards that form the Parliamentary constituency of Pendle, Lancashire, England. The ward returns three councillors to represent the northern half of Barnoldswick on Pendle Borough Council. The incumbent councillors are Marjorie Adams, Lindsay Gaskell and Janine Throupe, all Liberal Democrats.  As of the May 2011 Council election, Coates had an electorate of 4,166.

References

Wards of Pendle (UK Parliament constituency)
Barnoldswick